Smith Clinic is a historic office building located at Thomasville, Davidson County, North Carolina. It was built in 1939, and is a small one-story, Art Deco style brick building. The building measures approximately 34 feet wide and 104 feet deep. It features a projecting entrance bay of case concrete with a stepped parapet over the entrance. For more than 35 years after its construction, the building housed medical offices.

It was added to the National Register of Historic Places in 1991.

References

Office buildings on the National Register of Historic Places in North Carolina
Art Deco architecture in North Carolina
Commercial buildings completed in 1939
Buildings and structures in Davidson County, North Carolina
National Register of Historic Places in Davidson County, North Carolina
Thomasville, North Carolina